Kent Simpson may refer to:

Kent Simpson (ice hockey, born 1975), Canadian ice hockey left winger 
Kent Simpson (ice hockey, born 1992), Canadian ice hockey goaltender